Davers may refer to:

Davers Ile
Davers baronets
Robert Davers (disambiguation)
 Thomas Davers (1689-1746), Royal Navy officer